The 2012–13 season is Sporting Clube de Portugal's 80th season in the top flight, the Primeira Liga, known as the Liga ZON Sagres for sponsorship purposes. This article shows player statistics and all matches that the club plays during the 2012–13 season.

It is considered to be the worst season ever in Sporting's history. The club ended in the seventh place in the league table, the lowest position in the club's history, thus failing to qualify for the following season's UEFA Champions League and UEFA Europa League. Sporting were also eliminated from the Europa League group stage for the first time ever, ending in fourth place.

Competitions

Legend

Primeira Liga

League table

Results by round

Matches

Taça de Portugal

Taça da Liga

Group stage

UEFA Europa League

Play-off round

Group stage

Players

Transfers

In
Adrien Silva → Académica → Loan return
Cédric → Académica → Loan return
Marcos Rojo → Spartak Moscow → Undisclosed fee
Valentín Viola → Racing Club → Undisclosed fee
Danijel Pranjić → Bayern Munich → Free transfer
Zakaria Labyad → PSV → Free transfer
Khalid Boulahrouz → VfB Stuttgart → Free transfer
Gelson Fernandes → Saint-Étienne → Free transfer
Miguel Lopes → Porto → Free transfer
Hugo Ventura → Porto → Free transfer
Joãozinho → Beira-Mar → Loan

Out
Agostinho Cá → Barcelona B → Undisclosed fee
Amido Baldé → Vitória de Guimarães → Contract termination
André Marques → Sion → End of contract
Diogo Rosado → Blackburn Rovers → End of contract
Edgar Ié → Barcelona B → Undisclosed fee
João Pereira → Valencia → €3,684,210 + €526,320
Mateus Fonseca → Chiasso → Free transfer
Ricardo Batista → ? → End of contract
Rodolfo Simões → Académico de Viseu → Free transfer
Tiago Ferreira → End of career
Marco Torsiglieri → Metalist Kharkiv → Undisclosed fee
Ânderson Polga → São José → End of contract
Celsinho → Târgu Mureș → End of contract
Jaime Valdés → Parma → Undisclosed fee
Matías Fernández → Fiorentina → €3,136,842 + €1,500,000 
Florent Sinama Pongolle → Rostov → Contract termination
Mexer → Nacional → End of contract
Alberto Rodríguez → Rio Ave → Contract termination
Luis Aguiar → San Lorenzo de Almagro → Contract termination
Sebastián Ribas → Genoa → Loan return
Daniel Carriço → Reading  → €750,000
Marat Izmailov → Porto  → € Free transfer
Emiliano Insúa → Atlético Madrid  → €3,500,000
Bruno Pereirinha → Lazio  → €2,000,000
Xandão → Kuban Krasnodar  → Loan return

Out on loan

References

External links 
 Official club website 
 Zerozero 

2012-13
Portuguese football clubs 2012–13 season
Sporting CP